Klaus Heinrich Thomas Mann (18 November 1906 – 21 May 1949) was a German writer and dissident. He was the son of Thomas Mann, a nephew of Heinrich Mann and brother of Erika Mann (with whom he maintained a lifelong close relationship) and Golo Mann. He is well known for his 1936 novel, Mephisto.

Background 
Born in Munich, Klaus Mann was the son of German writer Thomas Mann and his wife, Katia Pringsheim. His father was baptized as a Lutheran, while his mother was from a family of secular Jews.

Career
Mann began writing short stories in 1924 and the following year became drama critic for a Berlin newspaper. His first literary works were published in 1925.

Mann's early life was troubled. His homosexuality often made him the target of bigotry, and he had a difficult relationship with his father. After only a short time in various schools, he traveled with his sister Erika Mann, a year older than himself, around the world, visiting the U.S. in 1927; they reported on the trip in essays published as a collaborative travelogue entitled Rundherum in 1929.

In 1924 he had become engaged to his childhood friend Pamela Wedekind, the eldest daughter of the playwright Frank Wedekind, who was also a close friend of his sister Erika.  The engagement was broken off in January 1928.

He traveled with Erika to North Africa in 1929. Around this time they made the acquaintance of Annemarie Schwarzenbach, a Swiss writer and photographer, who remained close to them for the next few years. Klaus made several trips abroad with Annemarie, the final one to a Soviet writers' congress in Moscow in 1934.

Since young adulthood, Klaus was using drugs, mostly opiates, to which he later became heavily addicted. His diaries document an attempted morphine-injection in 1933 when Hitler took power. Initially, the aspiring writer used opium, Eukodal and later heroin to possibly increase his creative energy, as this was often the case for artists and intellectuals in literary circles at the time. He underwent drug detoxification in Budapest during his frantic travels and at the Kilchberg Sanatorium in Switzerland. After 1936, during his stay in New York his drug use and sexual adventures became unconstrained.

In 1932 Klaus wrote the first part of his autobiography, which was well received until Hitler came to power.

In 1933 Klaus participated with Erika in a political cabaret, called Die Pfeffermühle (The Pepper-Mill), which came to the attention of the Nazi regime.  To escape prosecution he left Germany in March 1933 for Paris, later visiting Amsterdam and Switzerland, where his family had a house.  Also in 1933, Klaus Mann and Annemarie Schwarzenbach, together with Fritz Landshoff and Dutch publisher Emanuel Querido, founded Die Sammlung, a literary magazine, first published in September 1933 in Amsterdam. It was primarily affiliated with a number of influential German writers who fled from the Hitler regime during the first years of the establishment and consolidation of Nazi rule. The magazine was funded by the wealthy Annemarie Schwarzenbach, and Klaus Mann served as its editor-in-chief from 1933 to 1935, when Die Sammlungs activity ceased.

Klaus Mann not only played an important role in the consolidation of the German Exilliteratur but also communicated with authors who remained in Germany after 1933. In a letter exchange with Gottfried Benn, whose ambivalence towards Nazi rule was well known, Klaus expressed concern about his continued membership in the national German academy of writers, pointing out the moral dilemma it posed, even urging him to leave the country to join the German intellectuals in exile.

In November 1934 Klaus was stripped of German citizenship by the Nazi regime. He became a Czechoslovak citizen. In 1936, he moved to the United States, living in Princeton, New Jersey, and New York. In the summer of 1937, he met his partner for the rest of the year Thomas Quinn Curtiss, who was later a longtime film and theater reviewer for Variety and the International Herald Tribune. In 1940 Klaus Mann founded another literary magazine for German writers living in exile in the United States, Decision. It lasted for only a year, but consolidated American intellectual opposition to the war with Sherwood Anderson, W. Somerset Maugham, Vincent Sheean and Robert E. Sherwood onto its board of directors. At the time, he was living in February House, and his housemates W. H. Auden and Carson McCullers provided editorial and layout assistance. He eventually moved to his father's house in Pacific Palisades when he was unable to support himself financially.

Mann became a U.S. citizen in 1943. The process of naturalization was delayed because of an investigation the FBI conducted into Klaus Mann's political and sexual activities; he was openly gay but not an adherent of marxist ideologies. Throughout his life in the U.S., he identified himself as a liberal antifascist and cosmopolitan. In World War II, he served as a Staff Sergeant of the 5th U.S. Army in Italy. In summer 1945, he was sent by the Stars and Stripes to report from Postwar-Germany.

Mann's most famous novel, Mephisto, was written in 1936 and first published in Amsterdam. The novel is a thinly-disguised portrait of his former brother-in-law, the actor Gustaf Gründgens. The literary scandal surrounding it made Mann posthumously famous in West Germany, as Gründgens' adopted son brought a legal case to have the novel banned after its first publication in West Germany in the early 1960s. After seven years of legal hearings, the West German Supreme Court upheld the ban, although it continued to be available in East Germany and abroad. The ban was lifted and the novel published in West Germany in 1981.

Mann's novel Der Vulkan is one of the 20th century's most famous novels about German exiles during World War II.

Death
Mann died in Cannes from an overdose of sleeping pills on 21 May 1949, following further drug treatment.

In spite of speculation that he committed suicide because of material security, psychic isolation and a lifelong fascination with death, Mann's biographer Frederic Spotts argues that the engaged author's communications and attitude preceding his sudden overdose indicate rather an accident. He was buried in Cannes at the Cimetière du Grand Jas.

 Select bibliography 

 Der fromme Tanz, 1925
 Anja und Esther, 1925
 Kindernovelle, 1926  [published in the U.S. as The 5th Child, 1927]
 Revue zu Vieren, 1927
 Alexander, Roman der Utopie, 1929
 Auf der Suche nach einem Weg, 1931
 Kind dieser Zeit, 1932
 Treffpunkt im Unendlichen, 1932
 Journey into Freedom, 1934
 Symphonie Pathétique, 1935
 Mephisto, 1936
 Vergittertes Fenster, 1937
 Escape to Life, 1939 (with Erika Mann)
 Der Vulkan, 1939
 The Turning Point, 1942
 André Gide and the Crisis of Modern Thought, 1943
 The Chaplain, 1945

Film adaptations
 Mephisto, directed by István Szabó (1981, based on the novel Mephisto)
 The Volcano, directed by Ottokar Runze (1999, based on the novel Der Vulkan)

 See also 

 Dohm–Mann family tree
 Exilliteratur

 References 

Further reading
 Hauck, Gerald Günter. Reluctant Immigrants: Klaus and Erika Mann In American Exile, 1936-1945. 1997.
 Huneke, Samuel Clowes. 'The Reception of Homosexuality in Klaus Mann's Weimar Era Work.' Monatshefte für deutschsprachige Literatur und Kultur. Vol. 105, No. 1, Spring 2013. 86–100. doi: 10.1353/mon.2013.0027
 Keller, James Robert. The Role of Political and Sexual Identity in the Works of Klaus Mann. New York: Peter Lang, 2001. 
 Mann, Klaus. Il cappellano , by Pier Giorgio Ardeni and Alberto Gualandi, Pendragon 2018
 Mauthner, Martin. German Writers in French Exile, 1933–1940 London: Vallentine Mitchell, 2006 
 Schicker, Juliane. 'Decision. A Review of Free Culture' – Eine Zeitschrift zwischen Literatur und Tagespolitik. München: Grin, 2008. 
 Spotts, Frederic. Cursed Legacy: The Tragic Life of Klaus Mann New Haven: Yale University Press, 2016. 
 Harpole, Kimberley, and Waltraud Maierhofer. 'Women Performing the American 'Other' in Erika and Klaus Mann's Rundherum (1929). [https://mulpress.mcmaster.ca/sophiejournal/article/download/3155/2722 ''Sophie Journal     .] Vol.4, 2017. 1-32.

External links 

 
 The Works, Diaries and Letters are in the Munich Literatur-Archiv "Monancensia"
 Tagebuch 1931–1949 – Titel – Mann Digital – Monacensia – Digital

1906 births
1949 deaths
1949 suicides
20th-century American Jews
20th-century American novelists
20th-century American dramatists and playwrights
20th-century American essayists
20th-century German dramatists and playwrights
20th-century diarists
20th-century German male writers
20th-century German short story writers
20th-century LGBT people
20th-century American male writers
American male dramatists and playwrights
American male non-fiction writers
American diarists
American male novelists
Burials at the Cimetière du Grand Jas
Drug-related suicides in France
Exilliteratur writers
German autobiographers
German diarists
German gay writers
German literary critics
German male dramatists and playwrights
German male non-fiction writers
German male novelists
German male short story writers
German people of Jewish descent
German short story writers
German war correspondents
Jewish American dramatists and playwrights
Jewish American novelists
Jewish emigrants from Nazi Germany to the United States
American LGBT dramatists and playwrights
Klaus
Klaus
People educated at the Wilhelmsgymnasium (Munich)
People from the Kingdom of Bavaria
Ritchie Boys
War correspondents of World War II
Writers from Munich
United States Army personnel of World War II
United States Army soldiers
American gay writers